"Wrap Me Up" is a song recorded by Italian dance act Alex Party with vocals by British singer Shanie' Campbell. It was released in September 1995 as the third single from their debut album, Alex Party, and became a top-twenty hit in both the UK and Australia. The single also peaked at number-one in Italy, number six in Spain and number 15 in Finland. The accompanying music video first aired in October 1995.

Critical reception
Pan-European magazine Music & Media wrote, "In the wake of Don't Give Me Your Life, which was a pan-European success earlier this year, the Visnadi brothers haven't changed their winning team but have instead paired up with singer Shanie for what is likely to be their next Euro-dance hit." Alan Jones from Music Week commented, "It's taken Alex Party eight months to come up with a follow-up to their number two hit, Don't Give Me Your Life, and though Wrap Me Up has the same jaunty style with stomping beat supported by keyboard riffing, it hasn't got quite the same commercial edge. It is, however, a highly serviceable dance record, well put together and an obvious, if smaller, hit than its predecessor." James Hamilton from the magazine's RM Dance Update deemed it a "chanting girl nagged Italian smash".

Chart performance
"Wrap Me Up" debuted at number 44 on the Australian ARIA Singles Chart on the issue dated 11 February 1996. It later peaked at number 11 on the issue dated 12 May 1996 and spent a total of 22 weeks on the chart, earning a Gold certification from the Australian Recording Industry Association. In the UK, the single peaked at number 17 on the UK Singles Chart in November 1995. It was a major success in Alex Party's native Italy, rising to number-one, and in Spain, where it peaked at number six.

Track listing
CD single – Australia (1995)
 "Wrap Me Up" (Radio Edit) - 3:58
 "Wrap Me Up" (Dancing Divaz Club Edit) - 4:50
 "Wrap Me Up" (Light Piano Mix) - 5:31
 "Wrap Me Up" (FMS Edit) - 6:28
 "Wrap Me Up" (Original Version) - 5:23
 "Wrap Me Up" (LWS On A Mission) - 4:37

CD single – United Kingdom (1995)
 "Wrap Me Up" (Radio Edit) - 3:49
 "Wrap Me Up" (Dancing Divaz Club Edit) - 4:50 
 "Wrap Me Up" (FMS Edit) - 6:29
 "Don't Give Me Your Life" (LWS Instrumental Bitch Mix) - 5:04

Charts and certifications

Weekly charts

Year-end charts

Certifications

References

1995 singles
1995 songs
Alex Party songs
Number-one singles in Italy